Turone is both a surname and a given name. Notable people with the name include:

Maurizio Turone (born 1948), Italian footballer
Turone da Verona, 14th-century Italian painter

See also
Turones, a Celtic tribe of pre-Roman Gaul